Coffee production is the industrial process of converting the raw fruit of the coffee plant into the finished coffee. The coffee cherry has the fruit or pulp removed leaving the seed or bean which is then dried. While all green coffee is processed, the method that is used varies and can have a significant effect on the flavor of roasted and brewed coffee.   Coffee production is a major source of income for 12.5 million households, most in developing countries.

Picking 

A coffee plant usually starts to produce flowers three to four years after it is planted, and it is from these flowers that the fruits of the plant (commonly known as coffee cherries) appear, with the first useful harvest possible around five years after planting. The cherries ripen around eight months after the emergence of the flower, by changing color from green to red, and it is at this time that they should be harvested. In most coffee-growing countries, there is one major harvest a year; though in countries like Colombia, where there are two flowerings a year, there is a main and secondary crop, the main one April to June and a smaller one in November to December.

In most countries, the coffee crop is picked by hand, a labor-intensive and difficult process, though in places like Brazil, where the landscape is relatively flat and the coffee fields are immense, the process has been mechanized. Whether picked by hand or by machine, all coffee is harvested in one of two ways: 	

Strip picked 
All coffee fruit is removed from the tree, regardless of maturation state. This can either be done by machine or by hand. In the first method, pickers generally place a canvas on the ground. They then grab the branch next to the trunk with their hands and pull outward, knocking all of the fruit onto the ground. After doing this with all branches and trees for the length of the canvas, the pickers then collect the coffee in bags. This process can be facilitated through the use of mechanical strippers.

Selectively picked
Only the ripe cherries are harvested and they are picked individually by hand. Pickers rotate among the trees every eight to ten days, choosing only the cherries which are at the peak of ripeness. It usually takes two to four years after planting for a coffee plant to produce coffee beans that are ripe enough to harvest. The plant eventually grows small white blossoms that drop and are replaced by green berries. These green berries will become a deep red color as they ripen. It takes about 9 months for the green cherries to reach their deepest red color. Because this kind of harvest is labor-intensive, and thus more costly, it is used primarily to harvest the finer arabica beans.

The laborers who pick coffee by hand receive payment by the basketful. , payment per basket is between US$1.00 to $10 with the overwhelming majority of the laborers receiving payment at the lower end. An experienced coffee picker can collect up to six or seven baskets a day. Depending on the grower, coffee pickers are sometimes specifically instructed to not pick green coffee berries since the seeds in the berries are not fully formed or mature. This discernment typically only occurs with growers who harvest for higher end/specialty coffee where the pickers are paid better for their labor.

Lots including unripe coffee fruit are often used to produce cheaper mass consumer coffee beans, which are characterized by a displeasingly bitter/astringent flavor and a sharp odor. Red berries, with their higher aromatic oil and lower organic acid content, are more fragrant, smooth, and mellow. As such, coffee picking is one of the most important stages in coffee production.

Wet process 

In the 'Wet process', the fruit covering the seeds/beans is removed before they are dried. Coffee processed by the wet method is called wet processed or washed coffee. The wet method requires the use of specific equipment and substantial quantities of water.

The coffee cherries are sorted by immersion in water. Bad or unripe fruit will float and the good ripe fruit will sink. The skin of the cherry and some of the pulp is removed by pressing the fruit by machine in water through a screen. The bean will still have a significant amount of the pulp clinging to it that needs to be removed. This is done either by the classic ferment-and-wash method or a newer procedure variously called machine-assisted wet processing, aquapulping or mechanical demucilaging:

In the ferment-and-wash method of wet processing, the remainder of the pulp is removed by breaking down the cellulose by fermenting the beans with microbes and then washing them with large amounts of water. Fermentation can be done with extra water or, in "Dry Fermentation", in the fruit's own juices only.

The fermentation process has to be carefully monitored to ensure that the coffee does not acquire undesirable, sour flavors. For most coffees, mucilage removal through fermentation takes between 8 and 36 hours, depending on the temperature, thickness of the mucilage layer, and concentration of the enzymes. The end of the fermentation is assessed by feel, as the parchment surrounding the beans loses its slimy texture and acquires a rougher "pebbly" feel. When the fermentation is complete, the coffee is thoroughly washed with clean water in tanks or in special washing machines.

The fermentation process produces wastewater that contains a high organic load, which should be prevented from entering fresh water supplies. In machine-assisted wet processing, fermentation is not used to separate the bean from the remainder of the pulp; rather, this is done through mechanical scrubbing. This process reduce both water use and the generation of wastewater. In addition, removing mucilage by machine is easier and more predictable than removing it by fermenting and washing. However, by eliminating the fermentation step and prematurely separating fruit and bean, mechanical demucilaging can remove an important tool that mill operators have of influencing coffee flavor. Furthermore, the ecological criticism of the ferment-and-wash method increasingly has become moot, since a combination of low-water equipment plus settling tanks allows mill operators to carry out fermentation with limited pollution. The downside in using a machine assisted process or "semi-wash" is a high chance of the beans being chipped or damaged. The damaged beans are more prominent on lower altitude grown beans and certain varietals with porous features.

Any wet processing of coffee produces coffee wastewater, which can be a pollutant. Ecologically sensitive farms reprocess the wastewater along with the shell and mucilage as compost to be used in soil fertilization programs. The amount of water used in processing can vary, but most often is used in a 1 to 1 ratio.

After the pulp has been removed, what is left is the bean surrounded by two additional layers: the silver skin and the parchment. The beans must be dried to a water content of about 10% before they are stable. Coffee beans can be dried in the sun or by machine but in most cases it is dried in the sun to 12–13% moisture and brought down to 10% by machine. Drying entirely by machine is normally only done where space is at a premium or the humidity is too high for the beans to dry before mildewing.

When dried in the sun, coffee is most often spread out in rows on large patios where it needs to be raked every six hours to promote even drying and prevent the growth of mildew. Some coffee is dried on large raised tables where the coffee is turned by hand. Drying coffee this way has the advantage of allowing air to circulate better around the beans promoting more even drying but increases cost and labor significantly.

After the drying process (in the sun or through machines), the parchment skin or pergamino is thoroughly dry and crumbly, and easily removed in the hulling process. Coffee occasionally is sold and shipped in parchment or en pergamino, but most often a machine called a huller is used to crunch off the parchment skin before the beans are shipped.

Dry process 
Dry process, also known as unwashed or natural coffee, is the oldest method of processing coffee. The entire cherry after harvest is first cleaned and then placed in the sun to dry on tables or in thin layers on patios:

The harvested cherries are usually sorted and cleaned, to separate the unripe, overripe and damaged cherries and to remove dirt, soil, twigs and leaves. This can be done by winnowing, which is commonly done by hand, using a large sieve. Any unwanted cherries or other material not winnowed away can be picked out from the top of the sieve. The ripe cherries can also be separated by flotation in washing channels close to the drying areas.

The coffee cherries are spread out in the sun, either on large concrete or brick patios or on matting raised to waist height on trestles. As the cherries dry, they are raked or turned by hand to ensure even drying and prevent mildew. It may take up to four weeks before the cherries are dried to the optimum moisture content, depending on the weather conditions. On larger plantations, machine-drying is sometimes used to speed up the process. Various types of mechanical driers exist and can be fueled by gas, wood, or sometimes discarded parchment. The technique used to dry coffees mechanically can be viewed similarly to the roasting process; a drying regime can be employed in a way to preserve the quality of the beans.

The drying operation is the most important stage of the process, since it affects the final quality of the green coffee. A coffee that has been overdried will become brittle and produce too many broken beans during hulling (broken beans are considered defective beans). Coffee that has not been dried sufficiently will be too moist and prone to rapid deterioration caused by the attack of fungi and bacteria.

The dried cherries are stored in bulk in special silos until they are sent to the mill where hulling, sorting, grading and bagging take place. All the outer layers of the dried cherry are removed in one step by the hulling machine.

The dry method is used for about 90% of the Arabica coffee produced in Brazil, most of the coffees produced in Ethiopia, Haiti and Paraguay, as well as for some Arabicas produced in India and Ecuador. Almost all Robustas are processed by this method. It is not practical in very rainy regions, where the humidity of the atmosphere is too high or where it rains frequently during harvesting.

Semi-dry process 
Semi-dry is a hybrid process used in Indonesia and Brazil. The process is also called "wet-hulled", "semi-washed", "pulped natural" or, in Indonesia, "Giling Basah". Literally translated from Indonesian, Giling Basah means "wet grinding", and refers to an earlier "hulling" step than compared to the common washed/wet process.  This process is said to reduce acidity and increase body.

Most small-scale farmers in Sumatra, Sulawesi, Flores and Papua use the giling basah process. In this process, farmers remove the outer skin from the cherries mechanically, using locally built pulping machines. The coffee beans, still coated with mucilage, are then stored for up to a day. Following this waiting period, the mucilage is washed off and the parchment coffee is partially dried in the sun and sold at 25% to 40% moisture content. Directly hereafter the parchment layer is hulled off and the beans are dried further to 10–12% moisture content. Due to the "wet hulling" the beans end with a blue(ish) hue color. 

The tricky part during the semi-washed process method are bacteria which are always around. Fermentation can start immediately as honey dried coffee beans have a remaining "sugar" layer which is vulnerable to any sort of mold and offers feeding ground for bacteria. Drying carefully and under supervision is crucial to the success of this processing method. The beans need to constantly move during the drying process to prevent mold and fungal infections. The processor needs to rake the green coffee beans 2–3 times per hour to ensure a safe drying process. Once the beans have reached a sufficient moisture level, again, the beans are dry milled to remove the "parchment" layers and are sent off to roasters and wholesalers globally.

Honey processing bridges the gap between washed and natural coffees as it generally possesses some of the body and sweetness of a natural while retaining some of the acidity of a washed. Honey coffees often have a syrupy body with enhanced sweetness, round acidity and earthy undertones.

Milling 

The final steps in coffee processing involve removing the last layers of dry skin and remaining fruit residue from the now-dry coffee, and cleaning and sorting it. These steps are often called dry milling to distinguish them from the steps that take place before drying, which collectively are called wet milling.

Hulling 
The first step in dry milling is the removal of what is left of the fruit from the bean, whether it is the crumbly parchment skin of wet-processed coffee, the parchment skin and dried mucilage of semi-dry-processed coffee, or the entire dry, leathery fruit covering of the dry-processed coffee. Hulling is done with the help of machines, which can range from simple millstones to sophisticated machines that gently whack at the coffee.

Polishing 
This is an optional process in which any silver skin that remains on the beans after hulling is removed in a polishing machine. This is done to improve the appearance of green coffee beans and eliminate a byproduct of roasting called chaff. It is described by some to be detrimental to the taste. By raising the temperature of the bean through friction which changes the chemical makeup of the bean.

Cleaning and sorting 
Most fine coffee goes through a battery of machines that sort the coffee by the density of bean and by bean size, all the while removing sticks, rocks, nails, and miscellaneous debris that may have become mixed with the coffee during drying. First machines blow the beans into the air; those that fall into bins closest to the air source are heaviest and biggest; the lightest (and likely defective) beans plus chaff are blown in the farthest bin. Other machines shake the beans through a series of sieves, sorting them by size. Finally, a machine called a gravity separator shakes the sized beans on a tilted table, so that the heaviest, densest and best vibrate to one side of the pulsating table, and the lightest to the other.

The final step in the cleaning and sorting procedure is called color sorting, or separating defective beans from sound beans on the basis of color rather than density or size. Color sorting is the trickiest and perhaps most important of all the steps in sorting and cleaning. With most high-quality coffees color sorting is done in the simplest possible way: by hand. Teams of workers pick discolored and other defective beans from the sound beans. The very best coffees may be hand-cleaned twice (double picked) or even three times (triple picked). Coffee that has been cleaned by hand is usually called European preparation; most specialty coffees have been cleaned and sorted in this way.

Color sorting can also be done by machines. Streams of beans fall rapidly, one at a time, past sensors that are set according to parameters that identify defective beans by value (dark to light) or by color. A tiny, decisive puff of compressed air pops each defective bean out of the stream of sound beans the instant the machine detects an anomaly. However, these machines are currently not used widely in the coffee industry for two reasons. First, the capital investment to install these delicate machines and the technical support to maintain them is daunting. Second, sorting coffee by hand supplies much-needed work for the small rural communities that often cluster around coffee mills. Nevertheless, computerized color sorters are essential to coffee industries in regions with relatively high standards of living and high wage demands.

Grading 

Grading is the process of categorizing coffee beans by various criteria such as size of the bean, where and at what altitude it was grown, how it was prepared and picked, and how good it tastes (cup quality). Coffees also may be graded by the number of imperfections (broken, under-ripe, or otherwise defective beans; pebbles; sticks; etc.) per sample. For the finest coffees, origin of the beans (farm or estate, region, cooperative) is especially important. Growers of premium estate or cooperative coffees may impose a level of quality control that goes well beyond conventionally defined grading criteria, as this allows their coffee to command the higher price that goes with recognition of consistent quality.

Other steps

Aging 

All coffee when it was introduced in Europe came from the port of Mocha in what is now Yemen. Importing the beans to Europe required a lengthy sea voyage around the Horn of Africa, which ultimately changed the coffee's flavor due to age and exposure to saline air. Coffee later spread to India and Indonesia but still required a long sea voyage. Once the Suez Canal was opened, shipment time to Europe was greatly reduced and coffee with flavor less affected by salt and age began arriving. This fresher coffee was, to some degree, rejected as Europeans had not developed a taste for unaged coffee. To meet the demand for aged coffee, some product was aged in large, open-sided warehouses at port for six or more months in an attempt to expose the coffee to the same conditions that shipments used to require.

Although it is still widely debated and subject to personal taste, certain types of green coffee are believed to improve with age – especially strains valued for their low acidity, such as beans from Indonesia or India. Several coffee producers sell purposely aged beans, some aging for as long as eight years. However, coffee experts consensus is that a green coffee peaks in flavor and freshness within one year of harvest and that over-aged coffee beans lose much of their essential oil content.

Decaffeination 

Decaffeination is the process of extracting caffeine from green coffee beans prior to roasting. The most common decaffeination process used in the United States is supercritical carbon dioxide (CO2) extraction. In this process, moistened green coffee beans are contacted with large quantities of supercritical CO2 (CO2 maintained at a pressure of about 4,000 pounds force per square inch (28 MPa) and temperatures between ), which removes about 97% of the caffeine from the beans. The caffeine is then recovered from the CO2, typically using an activated carbon adsorption system.

Another commonly used method is solvent extraction, typically using oil (extracted from roasted coffee) or ethyl acetate as a solvent. In this process, solvent is added to moistened green coffee beans to extract most of the caffeine from the beans. After the beans are removed from the solvent, they are steam-stripped to remove any residual solvent. The caffeine is then recovered from the solvent, and the solvent is re-used. The Swiss Water Process is also used for decaffeination. Decaffeinated coffee beans have a residual caffeine content of about 0.1% on a dry basis. Not all facilities have decaffeination operations, and decaffeinated green coffee beans are purchased by many facilities that produce decaffeinated coffee.

Storage 

Green coffee is usually transported in jute bags or woven poly bags. While green coffee may be usable for several years, it is vulnerable to quality degradation based on how it is stored. Jute bags are extremely porous, exposing the coffee to whatever elements it is surrounded by. Coffee that is poorly stored may develop a burlap-like taste known as "bagginess", and its positive qualities may fade.

In recent years, the specialty coffee market has begun to utilize enhanced storage method. A gas barrier liner to jute bags, is sometimes used to preserve the quality of green coffee. Less frequently, green coffee is stored in vacuum packaging; while vacuum packs further reduce the ability of green coffee to interact with oxygen at atmospheric moisture, it is a significantly more expensive storage option.

Roasting 

Although not considered part of the processing pipeline proper, nearly all coffee sold to consumers throughout the world is sold as roasted coffee in general one of four degrees of roasting: light, medium, medium-dark, and dark. Consumers can also elect to buy unroasted coffee to be roasted at home. Green coffee can also be used for the preparation of infusions or ingested as ground powder, but this is of limited relevance to the global coffee market.

References 

Bibliography